81db is a band based in Italy that was formed in April 2006 by the Greek guitarist Kostas Ladopoulos. As he stated in the band's first interviews, the musical idea was to try to combine a new alternative rock/metal sound by mixing melodies and heavy guitar riffs with folk elements derived from Kostas’ Greek origins. The current members of the band are Kostas Ladopoulos (Guitars, Bouzouki), Filippo Capursi (Drums), William Frodella (Vocals), Vieri Pestelli (Bass). The band had their debut album out on 2009 through Orion’s Belt Records and published by EMI in Italy and distributed by Minos EMI in Greece. They are currently working with the producer Sylvia Massy for their upcoming release of 2011.

Biography
81db was formed in April 2006 by the Greek guitarist Kostas Ladopoulos. After a few changes to the line-up, the band found its current line-up, with singer William Frodella, Filippo Capursi on drums and Vieri Pestelli on bass.
81db finished their first demo CD at the beginning of November 2006 and the band started to look for a label.

Various podcasts and local radios played the song ‘Voices’ and got positive reviews for the home-made promo CD. Comments like "Extremely Original" "Without musical limits" "Psychotic sound" which was exactly what the compositions meant to achieve. In December 2007 "Nice Trip" went to no.1 metal song of 59.330 songs in the US Music Network, Soundclick. In March 2007 81db along with Fabio Bianchini, started filming a video of the song ‘Voices’. Later the web platform Digichannel with rock videos from around the world, chose the Voices Video Clip to be in their home page. The band kept going and playing concerts to support their EP in central and northern Italy. In November 2007 the band signed with a new-born label: Orion’s Belt records. A few months later, Deep Purple invited 81db to open their Turin concert on 13 July 2008.

In the meantime, after many successful international reviews to their self-produced 4-track promo EP, many people had become curious on what was going to follow up. In June 2008 the band entered the studio Larione10 of Florence to record 12 tracks which were going to be the final result for their debut album “Evaluation”.

Their debut CD, Evaluation, out on 20 March 2009 for Orion’s Belt Records and published by EMI publishing in Italy, was physically distributed by Minos EMI in Greece, SELF in Italy and digitally worldwide.

81db after some very good reviews for the album (Rock Hard Italy – 7.5/10, Metal Hammer Greece 9/10 and many more webzines and press) began touring the UK in November 2009 with excellent results and great feedback. Their video “voices” was in rotation on Headbanger’s ball of MTV Greece as well as the important Mad TV Greek music television. Their debut album was voted as the "2009 Top Record" from Vasilis Zaharopoulos, an important Metal Hammer editor of the Greek magazine.

All this noise made the producer Sylvia Massy interested at the project offering the band a chance to work with them at their studios for the upcoming second album that should be published in 2011.

The second album of the band called "Impressions" was announced to be released on April 25, 2011, by the UK label Rising Records.

In 2013 the band released its third album, "A Blind Man's Dream", inspired by the movie "One Flew Over the Cuckoo's Nest".

In 2017 the band self-released a single track, "The Monkey".

The band is currently on hiatus.

Band members
Current members
Kostas Ladopoulos - Guitars, Bouzouki (2006–present)
Vieri Pestelli - Bass (2008–present)
Past members
Filippo Capursi - Drums (2006–2017)
William Frodella - Vocals (2007–2016)
Antonio Cernivivo - Bass (2006–2007)
Francesco Payne - Vocals (2006)

Discography

Official Albums
Evaluation (Orion's Belt Records) - Produced by Kostas Ladopoulos

Impressions (Rising Records) - Produced by Sylvia Massy & Kostas Ladopoulos

A Blind Man's Dream - Produced by Kostas Ladopoulos

External links
Official sites
 Official site
 81db Myspace MySpace
 81db on Facebook

Sources
Jam Magazine (Italy, April 2009)

Greek Esquire (Greece, July 2009)

Italian Rock Hard (November 2009, January 2010)

Greek Rock Hard (March 2010)

Greek Metal Hammer (January 2010, March 2010)
 https://www.facebook.com/note.php?note_id=238245464106
 https://www.facebook.com/notes.php?id=14429069387&notes_tab=app_2347471856#!/note.php?note_id=191606179106
 https://www.facebook.com/note.php?note_id=380141914106
 http://www.lordsofmetal.nl/showinterview.php?id=3239&lang=en
 http://behindtheveil.freehostia.com/i81db.html
 https://web.archive.org/web/20110722042002/http://www.metal-empire.it/modules.php?name=News&file=article&sid=3133
 http://www.self.it/ita/details.php?nb=8019991869246&tc=c
 http://www.metal.it/album.aspx/10897/
 https://web.archive.org/web/20100918153616/http://www.rockpages.gr/detailspage.aspx?id=4051&type=1&lang=EN
 https://web.archive.org/web/20110721083714/http://www.rockpages.gr/detailspage.aspx?id=3633&type=3&lang=EN
 http://rockskini.blogspot.com/search/label/-%2081db
 http://ashladan.be/review/81db-evaluation
 http://www.lordsofmetal.nl/showreview.php?id=16166&lang=en#
 https://web.archive.org/web/20101230164025/http://metal-invader.com/gigs/81_Db_2009_11_24/gig.php

References

 https://www.facebook.com/notes.php?id=14429069387&notes_tab=app_2347471856#!/note.php?note_id=238245464106

Italian musical groups